Hazelight Studios is a video game development company based in Stockholm, Sweden. Founded by director Josef Fares in 2014, the company is best known for developing cooperative multiplayer games A Way Out and It Takes Two. Both games were published by Electronic Arts under the EA Originals label.

History

Prior to founding Hazelight, Josef Fares was a film director. His first video game project was Starbreeze Studios' Brothers: A Tale of Two Sons, which received critical acclaim when it was released in 2013. Following the success of Brothers, Fares decided to found a new video game production company based in Stockholm, with the focus of creating a mature, story-focused game. He was joined by the core Brothers development team from Starbreeze, which included Claes Engdal, Emil Claeson, Anders Olsson and Filip Coulianos. The studio was announced at The Game Awards 2014 by publisher Electronic Arts, which also revealed that it would publish the studio's first title. EA allowed Hazelight to share space at DICE so that they could fully focus on creating their game.

The company's first game, A Way Out, was announced by EA at E3 2017. It was part of EA Originals, EA's initiative to support independent games. The program allowed Hazelight to retain full creative control while receiving most of the game's profit after the development cost was recouped. EA gave the team a budget of $3.7 million. The game was released in March 2018 and it received generally positive reviews and sold 1 million copies within 2 weeks. The studio partnered with EA again for their next title, It Takes Two, a co-op platform game released in March 2021. The game won several awards during The Game Awards, including best family game, best multiplayer game, and Game of the Year.

In January 2022, Hazelight announced that they partnered with Dmitri M. Johnson and his company DJ2 Entertainment to adapt It Takes Two for television and film. It was then announced in April 2022 that Amazon Studios picked up the project to develop into a film adaptation to be written by Pat Casey and Josh Miller with Dwayne Johnson, Dany Garcia, and Hiram Garcia attached as producers under Seven Bucks Productions.

Games

References

External links
 

Companies based in Stockholm
Video game development companies
Swedish companies established in 2014
Video game companies established in 2014
Video game companies of Sweden
Indie video game developers